"This Girl" is a song by Australian DJs and producers Stafford Brothers and Eva Simons featuring T.I. It was released as a single in Australia on 27 June 2014 and globally on 12 August 2014.

The Stafford Brothers first leaked the collaboration via an exclusive private performance alongside Eva Simons in a Sydney warehouse in January 2014.  Chris Stafford says "We knew it was shaping up to be a great track when we first heard Eva's vocals, we were thrilled when we heard from management that T.I. was into it and wanted to do a feature. Having such a huge superstar be a part of this is truly amazing and a huge honour."

The song peaked at number 9 on the Australian Dance Chart and number 58 on the overall Australian Singles Chart, and number 7 in Belgium dance bubbling under chart.

Critical reception
Mike Wass of Idolator reviewed the song, saying; "“Give me wings, make me fly,” sings the Dutch dance queen over fluttery synths before arriving at the fast and furious chorus, which basically consists of her repeating: “do it one more time for this girl!” T.I shows up towards the end to rap about “making love in the Benz” but the real star is the manic production. After a seemingly endless string of folk-tinged EDM anthems, it's a relief to hear a balls-to-the-wall club banger."

Music video
The video was filmed in Atlanta, In describing the video, Chris Stafford said, "The first night of filming was like a party because it was in a club and everyone was drinking. The second day was much more serious, but it was in a strip club."

The video for "This Girl" was released on the Stafford Brothers' VEVO account on 3 September 2014.

Track listing
 Maxi Single
	This Girl (Radio Edit)	3:35
	This Girl (Explicit)	3:36
	This Girl (Parker Ighile House Of Hausa Mix)	3:45
	This Girl (Tom Swoon Remix)	6:03
	This Girl (Scndl Remix)	4:21
	This Girl (Togglehead Remix)	5:03

Weekly charts

References

2014 songs
2014 singles
Stafford Brothers songs
Eva Simons songs
T.I. songs
Cash Money Records singles
Songs written by T.I.
Songs written by Alex James (songwriter)
Songs written by Harry Sommerdahl
Songs written by Eva Simons
Songs written by Whitney Phillips